Kaloi is a taluka of Tharparkar District in Sindh, Pakistan.

See also
 Kaloi (tribe)
Sant Nenuram Ashram

Populated places in Sindh
Tharparkar District